Schillerbach is a river of Mecklenburg-Vorpommern, Germany. It flows into the Löcknitzer See, which is drained by the Randow, near Löcknitz.

See also
List of rivers of Mecklenburg-Vorpommern

Rivers of Mecklenburg-Western Pomerania
Rivers of Germany